Fabrice Moreau (born 7 October 1967 in Paris) is a French-Cameroonian former professional footballer who played as a midfielder.

Played in 17 different clubs before retiring at 36, in 2004. Born from a French father and a Cameroonian mother, he was a full international for the latter, although not in any major tournament's final stages.

Honours
Airdrieonians
Scottish Challenge Cup: 2000–01

References

External links
 
 
 
 

1967 births
Living people
French sportspeople of Cameroonian descent
Citizens of Cameroon through descent
French expatriate sportspeople in Spain
Cameroonian footballers
French footballers
Cameroon international footballers
1998 African Cup of Nations players
Association football midfielders
Footballers from Paris
Ligue 1 players
Paris Saint-Germain F.C. players
La Roche VF players
Ligue 2 players
Le Mans FC players
Racing Club de France Football players
Paris FC players
Olympique de Marseille players
SC Toulon players
La Liga players
Rayo Vallecano players
Talavera CF players
Beijing Guoan F.C. players
CD Numancia players
Notts County F.C. players
Airdrieonians F.C. (1878) players
Red Star F.C. players
Cameroonian expatriate sportspeople in China
French expatriate sportspeople in China
Cameroonian expatriate footballers
Expatriate footballers in Scotland
Expatriate footballers in Spain
Expatriate footballers in England
Expatriate footballers in China
Cameroonian expatriate sportspeople in England
Cameroonian expatriate sportspeople in Scotland
Cameroonian expatriate sportspeople in Spain